Roggenburg may refer to:

Roggenburg, Bavaria, Germany
Roggenburg Abbey, in Roggenburg, Bavaria
Roggenburg, Basel-Country, a municipality in the district of Laufen in the canton of Basel-Country in Switzerland.
Roggenburg, Schwyz, an island in Lake Lauerz in the canton of Schwyz in Switzerland